Clermont is a town in Pike and Wayne townships of Marion County, Indiana, United States. The population was 1,356 at the 2010 census. It has existed as an "included town" since 1970, when it was incorporated into Indianapolis as part of Unigov. It is legally part of Indianapolis, while retaining a town government under IC 36-3-2-5. The city is known for hosting Lucas Oil Raceway at Indianapolis, consisting of one of the nation's premier short-track ovals and also the premier American drag racing event, the NHRA U.S. Nationals.

History
The first post office at Clermont was established in 1831. Clermont was laid out in 1849.

Geography
Clermont is located at  (39.814339, −86.321575).

Demographics

As of the census of 2000, there were 1,477 people, 598 households, and 420 families residing in the town. The racial makeup of the town was 96.41% White, 1.62% African American, 0.07% Native American, 1.22% Asian, and 0.68% from two or more races. Hispanic or Latino of any race were 0.74% of the population.

There were 598 households, out of which 28.8% had children under the age of 18 living with them, 58.4% were married couples living together, 9.2% had a female householder with no husband present, and 29.6% were non-families. 22.7% of all households were made up of individuals, and 6.7% had someone living alone who was 65 years of age or older. The average household size was 2.47 and the average family size was 2.92.

In the town, the population was spread out, with 23.3% under the age of 18, 5.7% from 18 to 24, 30.5% from 25 to 44, 26.3% from 45 to 64, and 14.2% who were 65 years of age or older. The median age was 40 years. For every 100 females, there were 98.8 males. For every 100 females age 18 and over, there were 91.7 males.

The median income for a household in the town was $51,875, and the median income for a family was $64,464. Males had a median income of $40,500 versus $27,974 for females. The per capita income for the town was $25,149. About 4.0% of families and 6.8% of the population were below the poverty line, including 7.4% of those under age 18 and 12.8% of those age 65 or over.

Notable people 
 Tim Cindric – president of Team Penske Racing
 Eric Holcomb – 51st governor of the State of Indiana
 Mickey Powell – president of PGA of America and member of Indiana Golf Hall of Fame and PGA Hall of Fame
 Rick Downey -- Blue Oyster Cult band member
 Dick Simon – racecar driver and Dick Simon Racing team owner, drove in 17 Indianapolis 500s
 Bill York – media room chief for Indiana Pacers, Indianapolis Colts, Indianapolis Ice, and Indianapolis Motor Speedway
 Tom Zupancic – Indianapolis Colts executive and strength coach, 1993 Strongest Man in America runner-up
 Roman Kuzma – IndyCar team owner (Teamkar International)
 Dan Ingram – flat-track motorcycle racer
 Jim Hurtubise – racecar driver, 1960 Indianapolis 500 Rookie of the Year, drove in 10 Indianapolis 500s
 Mike Mosley – racecar driver, drove in 15 Indianapolis 500s
 Steve Chassey – racecar driver, drove in 3 Indianapolis 500s

References 

Towns in Marion County, Indiana
Towns in Indiana
Indianapolis metropolitan area